Gostyukhino is a rural locality (a village) in Klyazminskoye Rural Settlement, Kovrovsky District, Vladimir Oblast, Russia. The population was 88 as of 2010. There is 1 street.

Geography 
Gostyukhino is located 14 km east of Kovrov (the district's administrative centre) by road. Dostizheniye is the nearest rural locality.

References 

Rural localities in Kovrovsky District